María Alicia Sinigaglia (born 25 February 1964) is an Argentine fencer. She competed in the women's individual and team foil events at the 1984 Summer Olympics.

References

External links
 

1964 births
Living people
Argentine female foil fencers
Olympic fencers of Argentina
Fencers at the 1984 Summer Olympics
Pan American Games medalists in fencing
Pan American Games bronze medalists for Argentina
Fencers at the 1983 Pan American Games
20th-century Argentine women